Kaalangalil Aval Vasantham may refer to:
 Kaalangalil Aval Vasantham (1976 film)
 Kaalangalil Aval Vasantham (2022 film)